Medinet Habu is an archaeological locality situated near the foot of the Theban Hills on the West Bank of the River Nile opposite the modern city of Luxor, Egypt. Although other structures are located within the area, the location is today associated almost exclusively (and indeed, most synonymously) with the Mortuary Temple of Ramesses III.

The site of the temples was continuously inhabited since pharaonic times and continued to be until the 9th century, with last remnants of the town cleared during the excavations at the end of the 19th century.

Etymology 
The origins of the name Medinet Habu are unknown. The earliest attestations are the ones of European cartographers of the 17th-18th centuries who mention it as "Habu", "Medineh el Habou" and "Medinet Habu", with variants "Medinet Abu" and "Medinet Tabu".

The proposed etymologies include derivation from Coptic name for Luxor or from a name of high official of the 18th dynasty who was later deified, but neither of them is considered plausible, as they don't explain the final long -u. The folk etymology attributes the name to a mythical king named Habu.

The old Arabic name of the place Gabal Shama comes from Djami, which in turn is derived from Ancient Egyptian ḏꜣmwt, of unclear etymology. The Bohairic Coptic form Tchami comes from Demotic Tḏmꜣʾ, which is preceded by a feminine article, as also seen in Sahidic . Whether Thebes should be a phonetic rendering of the Egyptian name is disputed. 

In Greek the area was known as Memnonia or Kastron Memnonionos and was associated with Memnon. This name survives in Colossi of Memnon.

Temple of Amun
Just left of the entrance to the Mortuary Temple of Ramesses III is the Temple of Amun, (Ancient Egyptian: Djeser Set) dating to the 18th Dynasty, built by Hatshepsut and Thutmose III. It has undergone many alterations and modifications over the years, partially in the 20th, 25th, 26th, 29th and 30th Dynasties and the Greco-Roman period.

Temple of Ramesses III

It is quite well preserved and surrounded by a massive mudbrick enclosure, which may have been fortified. The original entrance is through a fortified gate-house, known as a migdol (and resembling an Asiatic fortress).

Just inside the enclosure, to the south, are chapels of Amenirdis I, Shepenupet II and Nitiqret, all of whom had the title of Divine Adoratrice of Amun.

The first pylon leads into an open courtyard, lined with colossal statues of Ramesses III as Osiris on one side, and uncarved columns on the other. The second pylon leads into a peristyle hall, again featuring columns of Ramses III. This leads up a ramp that leads (through a columned portico) to the third pylon and then into the large hypostyle hall (which has lost its roof).

Coptic settlement 

The Coptic settlement at Medinet Habu was established as the final stage of a continuous process of occupation of the mortuary complex of Ramses III, which began in pharaonic times and continued into the Roman and Late Antique period. The settlement was a densely populated town with an estimated population of 18,860 residents, which was installed in various inner sectors, including the temple itself. The settlement pattern matched that of the Karnak and Luxor temples, with large blocks of houses separated by narrow streets and religious buildings as important focal points of the urban texture.

Several churches were built in different sectors of the mortuary temple, including the great five-aisled basilica known as the "Holy Church of Djeme", which was located in the second court of Ramses III's temple. The church had a north-south orientation cutting across the original axis of the temple and was provided with a font and a well, placed at the southern end of the central nave. The church was dated between the 5th and the 7th century by Monneret de Villard, while Grossmann suggested an attribution to the middle or second half of the 6th century.

Before the clearing of the temple at the end of the 19th century, much of the Coptic town was still visible as it was left after its abandonment in the 9th century. The settlement's religious buildings, including the Holy Church of Djeme, were damaged over time, with one of the Ramesside columns on the east side removed to accommodate the apse and the Osiris pillars cut away since they were inappropriate in a Christian building. Sparse graffiti and damage are all that remain after the removal of the church in modern times.

Temple of Ay and Horemheb
Located just north of the Mortuary Temple of Ramesses III, right up to the mud-brick wall that surrounds it, lies the badly preserved Temple of Ay and Horemheb.

Gallery

Literature 
 James Henry Breasted The Excavation of Medinet Habu. Volume 1 General Plans and Views. University of Chicago Press, Chicago 1934.
 Uvo Hölscher: The Excavation of Medinet Habu. University of Chicago Press, Chicago 1934–1954.

References

Theban Necropolis
Ramesses III